Scaria is a genus of groundhoppers or pygmy grasshoppers in the tribe Batrachideini from South America. There are about eight described species in Scaria.

Species
Eight named, and one nameless species belong to the genus Scaria:
 Scaria boliviana Bruner, L., 1920 c g
 Scaria brevis Hancock, J.L., 1909 c g
 Scaria fasciata Hancock, J.L., 1907 c g
 Scaria ferruginea Hancock, J.L., 1909 c g
 Scaria hamata (De Geer, 1773) c g
 Scaria lineata Bolívar, I., 1887 c g
 Scaria maculata Giglio-Tos, 1898 c g
 Scaria producta Hancock, J.L., 1907 c g
"the nameless Scaria"
Data sources: i = ITIS, c = Catalogue of Life, g = GBIF, b = Bugguide.net

References

Further reading

 
 

Tetrigidae